Joel Caine (born 18 September 1978) is an Australian former professional rugby league footballer who played in the 1990s and 2000s and works as a presenter for Sportsbet.

Rugby League career
Caine played for the St. George Dragons, the Balmain Tigers and the Wests Tigers in the NRL. In the Super League he played for the London Broncos and the Salford City Reds.

Caine made his debut for St. George in round 23 of the 1998 NRL season against the Canberra Raiders at Bruce Stadium.  Caine played in St. George's final game before they formed a joint venture with the Illawarra Steelers to become St. George Illawarra.  A semi-final loss to Canterbury-Bankstown at Kogarah Oval.

In the 1999 NRL season, Caine joined Balmain.  He finished as the club's top point scorer in their final season as a stand-alone entity in the competition.  Caine played in the club's final game in the NRL which was a 42–14 loss against Canberra at Bruce Stadium.  Balmain would then merge with fellow foundation club Western Suburbs to form the Wests Tigers as part of the NRL's rationalisation policy.

In the inaugural Wests Tigers game in February 2000, Caine scored three tries and kicked four goals against the Brisbane Broncos. The 20 points scored was a club record for over five years, and it was over two years later before another Wests Tigers players scored a treble. Caine held the Wests Tigers' records for most total points scored by a player and most points scored in a season (224 in 2000). All records were later surpassed by Brett Hodgson. He remains the third highest point-scorer for the club, having scored 526 points during his 4 years with Wests Tigers.

Caine later played some country rugby league with the Parkes Spacemen. He was chosen to represent Western Division, but withdrew due to overseas travel.

Post Rugby League career
Caine has previously worked with radio's 2GB as a sideline reporter, and with television's ONE HD on Thursday Night Live (2009–10) and Sportsbet .

In 2011, he began co-hosting The Game Plan (NRL), which began airing on ONE HD and switched networks to Channel Ten in mid-2012.

In 2014, Caine became the face of Sportsbet.com.au for rugby league telecasts. This also sees him have a role on the Nine Network with The Footy Show.

In 2015, he was working as a rugby league commentator with Fox Sports.

In 2018, Caine became the lead commentator for Channel 9's coverage of The Intrust Super Premiership NSW.

In 2019, Caine was announced as one of the lead callers for 2GB's Continuous Call Team.  Caine was chosen to call games mainly on a Saturday and Sunday.

Personal life
He is older brother of the Cronulla Sharks player, Tony Caine.

References

External links
NRL stats
NRL points
NRL duo join Broncos
Caine leaves Salford
2005 Balmain Ryde Eastwood Premier League Season Report - by Jody Rudd
 Player Movements for 2006
Yesterdays Hero
 Middleton, David (Editor); 2008 Official Rugby League Annual; published 2009 for the National Rugby League by News Magazines, 170-180 Bourke Rd, Alexandria NSW, 2015
 

1978 births
Living people
Australian rugby league commentators
Australian rugby league players
Australian television personalities
St. George Dragons players
Balmain Tigers players
Wests Tigers players
London Broncos players
Salford Red Devils players
Continuous Call Team
Rugby league wingers
Rugby league fullbacks
Place of birth missing (living people)
Australian sports broadcasters